Iolaus timon, the long-tailed sapphire, is a butterfly in the family Lycaenidae. It is found in Guinea, Sierra Leone, Ivory Coast, Ghana, Togo, Nigeria, Cameroon, Gabon, the Republic of the Congo, Angola, the Democratic Republic of the Congo, Uganda and Tanzania. The habitat consists of forests.

Adults of both sexes have been recorded feeding from the large yellow flowers of asteraceous plants and the flowers of Poinsettia species.

The larvae feed on the flowers of Loranthus incanus, Phragmanthera capitata, Phragmanthera usuiensis and Phragmenthera polycrypta. They are dull green.

Subspecies
Iolaus timon timon (Guinea, Sierra Leone, Ivory Coast, Ghana, Togo, Nigeria: south and the Cross River loop, Cameroon, Gabon, Congo, northern Angola, Democratic Republic of the Congo)
Iolaus timon congoensis (Joicey & Talbot, 1921) (Democratic Republic of the Congo: Uele, Kivu, Tshopo, Tshuapa, Equateur, Kinshasa, Sankuru and Tanganika)
Iolaus timon orientius Hulstaert, 1924 (Uganda, north-western Tanzania)

References

External links

Die Gross-Schmetterlinge der Erde 13: Die Afrikanischen Tagfalter. Plate XIII 67 d

Butterflies described in 1787
Iolaus (butterfly)